is a railway station in the city of Akita, Akita Prefecture,  Japan, operated by JR East.

Lines

Station layout
The station has two opposed side platforms connected by a level crossing; however, only one platform is normally used for passenger traffic. The station is unattended.

Platforms

History
Katsurane Station opened as the Katsurane Signal Stop on 30 September 1962. It became a full passenger station on 31 March 1987.

Surrounding area
 
 Katsurane Beach

See also
List of railway stations in Japan

References

External links

 JR East Station information 

Railway stations in Japan opened in 1987
Railway stations in Akita Prefecture
Uetsu Main Line
Buildings and structures in Akita (city)